Wang Chung-ming (born 27 February 1958) is a Taiwanese politician. 

Wang was the deputy magistrate of Lienchang County until his September 2022 resignation. He was elected to succeed Liu Cheng-ying as county magistrate, defeating fellow Kuomintang member Tsao Erh-yuan and Democratic Progressive Party candidate . Before assuming office on 25 December 2022, Wang traveled to China to discuss the three links, which were later partly restored by the Taiwanese government.

References

External links

 
 

Living people
Magistrates of Lienchiang County
1958 births
21st-century Taiwanese politicians